XAP044 is a drug which acts as a potent and selective antagonist of the metabotropic glutamate receptor 7 (mGluR7). It inhibits long-term potentiation in the amygdala and inhibits responses associated with stress and anxiety in animal models, as well as being used to study the role of mGluR7 in various other processes.

References 

MGlu7 receptor antagonists
Iodoarenes
Phenol ethers
Chromanes